Border Roundup is a 1942 American Western film directed by Sam Newfield and written by Joseph O'Donnell. The film stars George F. Houston as the Lone Rider, Al St. John as his sidekick "Fuzzy" Jones, and Dennis Moore as Sheriff Smoky Moore, with Patricia Knox, Charles King and I. Stanford Jolley. The film was released on September 18, 1942, by Producers Releasing Corporation.

This is the tenth movie in the "Lone Rider" series, which spans seventeen films—eleven starring George Houston, and a further six starring Robert Livingston.

Houston, once an opera singer, sang three songs in this film: "There's a Cabin in the Clearin", "When a Cowboy Rides" and "The Rollin' Hills". The songs were written by Johnny Lange and Lew Porter.

Plot

Cast          
George F. Houston as Tom Cameron, the Lone Rider
Al St. John as Fuzzy Jones
Dennis Moore as Sheriff Smoky Moore 
Patricia Knox as Amy Sloane
Charles King as Blackie
I. Stanford Jolley as Masters 
Edward Peil Sr. as Sheriff 
Jimmy Aubrey as Sourdough
John Elliott as Jeff Sloane

See also
The "Lone Rider" films starring George Houston:
 The Lone Rider Rides On (1941)
 The Lone Rider Crosses the Rio (1941)
 The Lone Rider in Ghost Town (1941)
 The Lone Rider in Frontier Fury (1941)
 The Lone Rider Ambushed (1941)
 The Lone Rider Fights Back (1941)
 The Lone Rider and the Bandit (1942)
 The Lone Rider in Cheyenne (1942)
 The Lone Rider in Texas Justice (1942)
 Border Roundup (1942)
 Outlaws of Boulder Pass (1942)
starring Robert Livingston: 
 Overland Stagecoach (1942)
 Wild Horse Rustlers (1943)
 Death Rides the Plains (1943)
 Wolves of the Range (1943)
 Law of the Saddle (1943)
 Raiders of Red Gap (1943)

References

External links
 

1942 films
American Western (genre) films
1942 Western (genre) films
Producers Releasing Corporation films
Films directed by Sam Newfield
American black-and-white films
1940s English-language films
1940s American films